Eumorsea is a genus of grasshoppers in the family Eumastacidae, the monkey grasshoppers.

Species include:
Eumorsea balli – Ball's monkey grasshopper
 Eumorsea pinaleno – Pinaleno monkey grasshopper
Eumorsea truncaticeps

References 

Caelifera genera
Taxonomy articles created by Polbot
Eumastacidae